Dionysia aretioides, the aretioid dionysia, is a species of flowering plant in the genus Dionysia native to the central Alborz mountains of northern Iran. It has gained the Royal Horticultural Society's Award of Garden Merit.

References

Primulaceae
Endemic flora of Iran
Plants described in 1846